Xinli Subdistrict is a subdistrict located on southern Dongli District, Tianjin, China. It borders Wanxin Subdistrict and Tianjin Aviation Logistics District to its north, Jinqiao Subdistrict to its east, Shuangqiaohe and XInashuigu Towns to its south, Xinzhuang and Shuanggang Towns to its southwest, as well as Zhangguizhuang and Fengniancun Subdistricts to its west. In 2010, its population is 136,357.

History

Administrative divisions 
By 2022, Xinli Subdistrict has 26 subdivisions, more specifically 16 residential communities and 10 villages. They are listed as followed:

See also 

 List of township-level divisions of Tianjin

References 

Township-level divisions of Tianjin
Dongli District